Route 150 is a highway on the south side of the Kansas City, Missouri Metro Area.  It runs east from the Kansas–Missouri state border to US 50 in Lone Jack, its length totaling to around 25.6 miles.

Route description
In the west, Route 150 begins as it crosses from Kansas into Missouri. The highway initially heads southeastward, but soon turns towards the east and passes along the northern boundary of the former Richards-Gebaur Air Force Base. It has an interchange with I-49/US 71 and takes on the name East 147th Street. Continuing east, it then transitions into East Outer Belt Road before meeting an interchange with Route 291. Route 150 bypasses the James A. Reed Memorial Wildlife Area to the south, and its local name changes several times. East of Greenwood, it has a short concurrency with Route 7. The roughly half-mile south–north concurrency ends when Route 150 bears east through rural land. It turns due north on South Bynum Road once in Lone Jack and eventually terminates at US 50.

History
Modern-day Route 150 was once a Missouri supplemental route. The current designation was assigned in its entirety by 1949. 

Until the 1990s, Route 150 continued into Kansas as K-150.

Route 150 underwent an improvement project, including reconstruction of the I-49/US 71 interchange and widening. The three-phase project began in the summer of 2010 and was completed in 2012.

Junction list

References

150
Transportation in Jackson County, Missouri
Transportation in the Kansas City metropolitan area
Transportation in Kansas City, Missouri